The Hagerstown ALPB Team are a professional baseball team planned to begin play in 2024 in Hagerstown, Maryland. The franchise will compete in the Atlantic League of Professional Baseball and play their home games at the under-construction Hagerstown Multi-Use Sports and Events Facility.

History 
The team's creation was announced on September 1, 2021, with the intent to start playing in 2023. The delay to 2024 was announced in March 2022 based on the time needed to complete the stadium.

Management 
The locally based ownership, Downtown Baseball LLC, consists of Howard "Blackie" Bowen (President), Don Bowman, James Holzapfel, and Frank Boulton.

References

External links
 Atlantic League of Professional Baseball

Atlantic League of Professional Baseball teams
Professional baseball teams in Maryland
Hagerstown, Maryland